The Capilano Bridge is a six lane bridge that spans the North Saskatchewan River in Edmonton, Alberta, Canada.  It was built in 1969, is named for the nearby Capilano neighbourhood, and is part of Wayne Gretzky Drive.

Capilano Bridge connects the communities of Capilano/Forest Heights on the south end to Virginia Park/Highlands on the north end.

The bridge's sidewalk was closed in June 2021 and remained so for about two months for maintenance.

The southwest trail, located just west of the Capilano Bridge on the southside of the river, has been closed since January 2020 after a section of a walking trail collapsed. Following the closure, a project for repairing and renewal was introduced by the City of Edmonton.

See also 
 List of crossings of the North Saskatchewan River
 List of bridges in Canada

References

Bridges in Edmonton
Road bridges in Alberta